The 2008 World Cup of Pool was the third edition of the tournament. The event was held again in Rotterdam, Netherlands, from October 7–11, 2008.

Participating nations

 (Stuart Lawler and John Wims)
 (Martin Kempter and Jasmin Ouschan)
 (Serge Das and Noel Bruynooghe)
 (Edwin Montal and Tyler Edey)
 (Fu Jian-bo and Li He-wen)
 (Philipp Stojanovic and Ivica Putnik)
 (Kasper Kristoffersen and Martin Larsen)
 (Daryl Peach and Mark Gray)
 (Mika Immonen and Markus Juva)
 (Stephan Cohen and Vincent Facquet)
 (Thomas Engert and Ralf Souquet)
 (Kenny Kwok and Lee Chenman)
 (Bjorgvin Hallgrimsson and Kristján Helgason)
 (Alok Kumar and Sumit Talwar)
 (Fabio Petroni and Bruno Muratore)
 (Naoyuki Oi and Satoshi Kawabata)
 (Kim Woong-dae and Jeong Young-hwa)
 (Ibrahim Bin Amir and Lee Poh Soon)
 (Tony Drago and Alex Borg)
 A (Niels Feijen and Nick van den Berg)
 B (Roy Gerards and Gijs van Helmond)
 (Jhon Lopez and Juan Vega)
 (Francisco Bustamante and Dennis Orcollo)
 (Radosław Babica and Mateusz Śniegocki)
 (Bashar Hussain and Fahad Ahmed Al Mohammadi)
 (Konstantin Stepanov and Ruslan Chinakhov)
 (David Alcaide and Carlos Cabello)
 (Marco Tschudi and Dimitri Jungo)
 (Wu Chia-ching and Wang Hung-Hsiang)
 (Dechawat Poomjang and Nitiwat Kanjanasri)
 (Rodney Morris and Shane Van Boening)
 (Luong Chi Dung and Thanh Nam Nguyen)

Tournament bracket

Final

The American duo of Rodney Morris and Shane Van Boening beat the English team of Daryl Peach and Mark Gray with 11–7 to win the first championship for United States.

References

External links

2008
2008 in cue sports
2008 in Dutch sport
International sports competitions hosted by the Netherlands
Sports competitions in Rotterdam